"It's Raining Again" is a song recorded by the English progressive rock band Supertramp and released as a single from their 1982 album …Famous Last Words… with credits given to Rick Davies and Roger Hodgson, although as indicated on the album sleeve, it is a Hodgson composition. The end of the song incorporates the old nursery rhyme "It's Raining, It's Pouring".

Reception
Cash Box said it is "vintage Supertramp with all of the elements that have made the group’s sound so distinctive" and that it is "bouncy and hook-laden."  Billboard called it a "lush midtempo charmer."

The song debuted at No. 31 on 30 October 1982 on the Billboard Hot 100, becoming the second highest debut on that chart for all of 1982 (exceeded only by "Ebony and Ivory" at No. 29 on 10 April 1982), but it only peaked at No. 11, making it one of the few songs to enter the chart in the Top 40 but not reach the Top 10.

Track listings

7-inch vinyl

Personnel

Roger Hodgson – piano, lead and backing vocals, glockenspiel
Dougie Thomson – bass
Bob Siebenberg – drums
Rick Davies – additional synthesizers, melodica solo
John Helliwell – baritone (middle of song) and tenor saxophones, synthesizers

Charts

Certifications

Notes

References

1982 songs
1982 singles
Supertramp songs
Songs about loneliness
Songs written by Rick Davies
Songs written by Roger Hodgson
Music videos directed by Russell Mulcahy
A&M Records singles
Songs based on children's songs